is a 2014 anime television series produced by Shaft, based on the Kagerou Project created by Jin. The series began airing in Japan from April 12, 2014 and is being simulcast by Crunchyroll. The series is licensed in North America by Aniplex of America. The main opening theme is "Daze" by Maria from Garnidelia, and the main ending theme is "Days" by Lia. The story follows a group known as the Mekakushi-Dan (Blindfold Gang), consisting of various people possessing unique powers.

The series is directed by Yūki Yase and chief directed by Akiyuki Shinbo. The original creator, Jin, wrote the series composition and screenplay to the series, and also composed the music alongside several other artists. Genichirou Abe (Shaft) designed the characters.



Episode list
{|class="wikitable" width="100%" style="background:#FFF;"

Notes

References

External links
Anime official website 

Mekakucity Actors